The American Osteopathic Board of Nuclear Medicine (AOBNM) is an organization that provides board certification to qualified Doctors of Osteopathic Medicine (D.O.) who specialize in the use of radioactive substances in the diagnosis and treatment of disease (nuclear medicine physicians). The board is one 18 medical specialty certifying boards approved by the American Osteopathic Association Bureau of Osteopathic Specialists (AOABOS) of the American Osteopathic Association, and was established in 1974. As of December 2011, 32 osteopathic nuclear medicine physicians held active certification with the AOBNM.

Board certification
Osteopathic nuclear medicine physicians are eligible for initial certification if they have successfully completed an AOA-approved residency in nuclear medicine, have a current practice in nuclear medicine, an AOA membership that is in good standing, and an unrestricted medical license in the state in which their practice is located.

Diplomates certified in nuclear medicine prior to 1995 are eligible for voluntary recertification that expires after ten years. Since 1995, the American Osteopathic Board of Nuclear Medicine requires osteopathic nuclear medicine physicians to renew their certification every ten years to avoid expiration of their board certified status.

See also
American Board of Nuclear Medicine
American Osteopathic Association Bureau of Osteopathic Specialists

References

External links
 AOBNM homepage

Osteopathic medical associations in the United States
Organizations established in 1974
Medical and health professional associations in Chicago
Nuclear medicine organizations